MedPark station is a commuter rail station in Denton, Texas serving the A-train line. It is east of Interstate 35E and serves Denton Regional Medical Center and a major retail area surrounding Golden Triangle Mall in Denton. MedPark station is currently the penultimate station on the A-Train.

References

External links
My A-train, DCTA

A-train (Denton County Transportation Authority) stations
Railway stations in Denton County, Texas
Railway stations in the United States opened in 2011
Buildings and structures in Denton, Texas